Magongnaru Station is a railway station on Seoul Subway Line 9 and AREX. It was opened later than other stations on both lines because of the lack of development in the surrounding area.

Station layout

Gallery

External links

Seoul Metropolitan Subway stations
Metro stations in Gangseo District, Seoul
Railway stations opened in 2014
2014 establishments in South Korea